The Diocese of Dourados is a Latin Church ecclesiastical territory or diocese of the Catholic Church located in the city of Dourados, Brazil. It is a suffragan in the ecclesiastical province of the metropolitan Archdiocese of Campo Grande.

History
 June 15, 1957: Established as Diocese of Dourados from the Diocese of Corumbá

Bishops
 Bishops of Dourados , in reverse chronological order
 Bishop Henrique Aparecido de Lima, C.SS.R. (2015.10.21 -
 Bishop Redovino Rizzardo, C.S. (2001.12.05 – 2015.10.21)
 Bishop Alberto Johannes Först, O. Carm. (1990.05.12 – 2001.12.05)
 Bishop Teodardo Leitz, O.F.M. (1970.11.27 – 1990.05.12)
 Bishop Carlos Schmitt, O.F.M. (1960.08.29 – 1970.02.14)
 Bishop José de Aquino Pereira (1958.01.23 – 1960.03.26), appointed Bishop of Presidente Prudente, São Paulo

Coadjutor bishops
Alberto Johannes Först, O. Carm. (1988-1990)
Redovino Rizzardo, C.S. (2001)

References
 GCatholic.org
 Catholic Hierarchy

Roman Catholic dioceses in Brazil
Christian organizations established in 1957
Dourados, Roman Catholic Diocese of
Roman Catholic dioceses and prelatures established in the 20th century